The Shohimardonsoy is a river in Kyrgyzstan and Uzbekistan. It is formed at the confluence of the rivers Aksuu and Köksuu, that run from the Alay Range, near the village Shohimardon. Its lower course, between Vodil and the city Fergana, is known as Margʻilonsoy. It discharges into the Great Fergana Canal near Margilan. The main settlements along the river Shohimardonsoy are the cities Margilan, Fergana and Kadamjay, and the town Vodil.

References 

Rivers of Kyrgyzstan
Rivers of Uzbekistan